The 2015 Patna Pirates season statistics for the contact team sport of kabaddi are here.

Fixtures and results

Points table

League Stage

Semi-final

Third-place match

See also
Kabaddi in India
Punjabi Kabaddi

References

Patna Pirates